The City Investing Building, also known as the Broadway–Cortlandt Building and the Benenson Building, was an office building and early skyscraper in Manhattan, New York. Serving as the headquarters of the City Investing Company, it was on Cortlandt Street between Church Street and Broadway in the Financial District of Lower Manhattan. The building was designed by Francis Kimball and constructed by the Hedden Construction Company.

Because of the area's sloping topography, the City Investing Building rose 32 stories above Broadway and 33 stories above Church Street, excluding an attic. The bulk of the building was 26 stories high above Church Street and was capped by a seven-story central portion with gable roofs. The building had an asymmetrical F-shaped footprint with a light court facing Cortlandt Street, as well as a wing to Broadway that wrapped around a real estate holdout, the Gilsey Building. Inside was a massive lobby stretching between Broadway and Church Street.

Though developed by the City Investing Company, the structure had multiple owners throughout its existence. The City Investing Building was sold to the financier Grigori Benenson (1860–1939) in 1919 and renamed the Benenson Building. After Benenson was unable to pay the mortgage, it was sold twice in the 1930s. The building was renamed 165 Broadway by 1938 and was renovated in 1941. The City Investing Building and the adjacent Singer Building were razed in 1968 to make room for One Liberty Plaza, which had more than twice the floor area than the two former buildings combined.

Site 
The City Investing Building was in the Financial District of Lower Manhattan, with frontage on Church Street to the west, Cortlandt Street to the north, and Broadway to the east. The site slopes down from Broadway to Church Street, so that there was a raised basement facing Church Street, which was below ground at Broadway.

The City Investing Building's northeastern section wrapped around a real estate holdout, the Gilsey Building (also the Wessels Building or Benedict Building), at the southwestern corner of Cortlandt Street and Broadway. The City Investing Building's original owner, the City Investing Company, held a long-term lease for the Gilsey Building, which would have eventually been demolished to make way for an addition to the City Investing Building. The narrowness of the gap was a result of a design choice by the Singer's architect, Ernest Flagg. The columns required to support the Singer Tower would have been too large to place atop the original Singer Building, at the south end of the same block near Liberty Street.

Architecture 

The City Investing Building was designed by Francis H. Kimball. The general contract was awarded to the Hedden Construction Company and the contract for the foundation work was given to the O'Rourke Engineering and Contracting Company. In addition, Weiskopf and Stern were consultants for the steel frame, Griggs and Holbrook were consultants for steam and electricity, and William C. Tucker was consulting sanitary engineer. The steel was made by the American Bridge Company and erected by Post and McCord. The stonework came from William Bradley & Sons; the ornamental ironwork from Hecla Iron Works; the terracotta and other tilework from the National Fireproofing Company; the plumbing from Wells and Newton; and the marble work from J. H. Shipway and Bros.

The City Investing Building's facade was divided into three horizontal sections: a base with four stories and a raised basement; a shaft with 21 stories and a full-height cornice; and a capital with six stories and an attic. There was also a cellar below the raised basement. Sources differ on how many stories the building had. An official building brochure and the Engineering Record described the building as having 32 stories, as counted from Broadway, although this excluded the attic. The Real Estate Record and Guide described the building as rising 33 stories, as counted from Church Street, but excluding the attic.

Form 
The City Investing Building was largely shaped in an "F", with the two northward "prongs" of the "F" flanking a  light court on Cortlandt Street. The light court rose above the second story on the Cortlandt Street elevation. A wing ran eastward to Broadway, between the Gilsey and Singer buildings. The bulk of the building, comprising the base and shaft, consisted of 25 occupiable stories above Broadway, plus a 26th story in the cornice. The "prongs" on Cortlandt Street were designed as narrow towers terminating at the 26th story. Above the Broadway wing, the 26th story was topped by a series of engaged columns with a belvedere at the center. A flat roof rose above much of the 26th story. The central section of the building, recessed from the light court on Cortlandt Street, rose six additional stories into the capital, with an ornate gable roof made of copper. A smaller gable rose to the 31st floor directly to the east.

Facade 

The five-story base was clad with light stone, while the shaft and capital were decorated with white brick and terracotta. Porcelain and enamel brick were used to reduce cleaning costs, since that type of brick did not discolor over time.

The main entrance was at Broadway and contained a semicircular-headed opening. The fourth floor was topped by a large cornice that was at the same level as the roof of the six-story Gilsey Building. Robert E. Dowling, the building's developer, hired Vincenzo Alfano to design sculptural groups for the facade.

The 5th through 25th floors contained window bays, which generally contained two or three windows on each story. The corner bays on the "prongs" facing Cortlandt Street contained one window per floor. At various points on the facade, some of the center bays on each side contained groupings of several stories, each of which contained engaged columns and balconies. There were also horizontal belt courses between several stories. The 26th floor was inside the cornice.

Structural features 
The City Investing Building used a steel frame with concrete-slab floors, terracotta floor arches and partitions, and interior marble work. When completed, the building was said to weigh , excluding live loads. Also included in the building was many miles of plumbing, steam piping, wood base, picture molding, conduits, and electrical wiring. The building contained woodwork made of fireproofed mahogany.

Superstructure 
The superstructure consisted of a steel cage wherein the columns at every story supported the walls. The columns, in turn, sat on cast-steel pedestals, which transmitted their loads through girders and grillages. There were 89 columns on each floor, arranged in six rows. The floors consisted of hollow-tile flat arches or concrete with cinder filling, and were surfaced with mosaic or terrazzo tiles. Portal braces and curved knee braces were included to provide wind resistance, but also contributed to the building's weight.

The exterior walls were curtain walls whose thicknesses had been prescribed by city building codes of the time. There were also two walls carried atop the third-floor girders, which extended to the 27th and 32nd floors.

Foundation 
The foundation was excavated using rectangular caissons of varying width. The pits were drilled through layers of earth, quicksand, clay, gravel, and water to a solid rock layer  beneath Broadway. A steel shaft rose from each of the caissons. The underlying ground was drawn out from the caissons, and then the caissons were filled with concrete. Sections of the masonry basement floors from the previous buildings on the site were also removed in the process.

Within the foundation were placed 59 concrete piers, which carried the columns of the aboveground superstructure. The caissons supported foundation piers that were topped by plates with grillages of transversely laid I-beams. Most of the superstructure's exterior columns were supported on cantilevers; deep plate girders were placed over the grillages, and the cantilevers extended outward from these girders, where they supported the columns. The foundation also used distributing girders, some of which were triple girders weighing . This helped distribute the building loads and counteracted the upward hydrostatic pressure.

Interior

Interior spaces 

The City Investing Building was one of New York City's largest office buildings at the time of its completion, with an estimated  of floor area. Generally, there was more space on higher stories than on lower stories, largely because the building's elevators were staggered into three banks serving different sets of floors. However, the 27th through 31st floors, located in the smaller "capital" of the building, typically had . On the top of the building was a luncheon club.

Inside the vestibule was a double-height lobby running westward to the elevated Cortlandt Street station of the Interborough Rapid Transit Company's Sixth Avenue Line at Church Street. The arched ceiling of the lobby was decorated with colorful frescoes. The lobby was clad throughout with several types of Italian marbles. Three elevator banks extended from the southern wall of the lobby. The second floor contained offices north of the lobby, and a footbridge was placed across the lobby to connect the elevators and offices.

The upper floors typically had a west–east elevator hallway along the southern wall, with the other areas being used for rental space. Generally, the ceiling heights of the lower stories were higher than on the upper stories.

Utilities and elevators 
A  cellar extended under the Broadway sidewalk, and contained the building's boiler room. Also in the building was an electric light plant. 

The building contained 24 elevators in total. From the lobby, there were 21 plunger elevators for passengers and 2 electric elevators for freight. The plunger elevators were made by the Standard Plunger Company and the electric elevators were made by Otis Elevator. The elevators were placed in three banks the south side of the building, along the section facing the Singer Tower. Seven elevators served all the floors from the lobby to the 9th story; another seven ran express from the lobby to the 9th story, then served all floors through the 17th; and the final seven ran express from the lobby to the 17th story, then served all floors to the 26th. A separate elevator served the 25th through 32nd stories. Two staircases ran between the basement and 25th floor, with another staircase running to the 32nd floor.

History
The City Investing Building was developed by Robert E. Dowling, who in the first decade of the 20th century was also developing the Trinity and United States Realty Buildings nearby. Dowling was the president of the City Investing Company, a conglomerate that had split from the United States Realty and Construction Company in late 1904. By early 1906, he had hired Kimball, who at the time was well known for constructing other bulky skyscrapers whose construction required pneumatic caissons. Dowling intended the building to include large floors for the growing number of tenants who sought large amounts of office space on a single floor. Dowling also wanted a building with a grand lobby and 21 tenant elevators.

Construction 

The City Investing Company bought the Coal and Iron Exchange Building at Church and Cortlandt Streets in January 1906. It bought further land on Cortlandt Street the same April. The general construction contract was given to the Hedden Construction Company in September 1906. The next month, there circulated rumors that the City Investing Building would rise to 39 stories—one less than the Singer Tower to the south, which was simultaneously being erected as the world's tallest building—but this modification did not happen. Demolition of buildings on the City Investing Building's site proceeded through 1906. The Coal and Iron Exchange Building took five months to destroy, because of the extremely thick materials it used; it was demolished by October 1906, although its cornerstone was not retrieved until June 1907.

Excavation of the foundations began in November 1906, with an average of 275 workers during the day shift and 100 workers during the night shift. The excavation was required to be completed in 120 days. To remove the spoils from the foundation, three temporary wooden platforms were constructed to street level. Hoisting engines were installed to place the beams for the foundation, while the piers were sunk into the ground under their own weight. Because of the lack of space in the area, the contractors' offices were housed beneath the temporary platforms.

After the foundations were completed, a light wooden falsework was erected on the Broadway wing to support the traveler, which contained two derricks to erect the massive girders in that section. The traveler was moved deeper into the lot as the girders were erected. The girders were erected quickly at night, with 16 girders and 20 columns being erected in a week. A worker was killed during construction when a temporary floor collapsed in June 1907. The building was completed in a then-record 22 months, having employed 3,000 workers.

Use 
Tenants started moving into the building in April 1908. Early tenants of the City Investing Building included the Interborough Rapid Transit Company, Midvale Steel, the American Car and Foundry Company, the Southern Pacific Transportation Company, the Westinghouse Air Brake Company, New York Air Brake, and the Jones and Laughlin Steel Company. In December 1919, London banker Grigori Benenson bought the City Investing Building for $10 million in cash. At the time, the building was estimated to be worth $7 million, but contained a $5.75 million mortgage held by the Metropolitan Life Insurance Company. The City Investing Building was accordingly renamed the Benenson Building. Benenson acquired the title to the building in July 1920. He received a $9.5 million mortgage loan for the building in 1926.

During the 1920s, the Benenson Building gained tenants such as the Chemical Bank and advertising agency Albert Frank & Company. Benenson also brought adjacent property to the north, intending to construct a supertall skyscraper on the site, but these plans were canceled due to the Wall Street Crash of 1929. Benenson's company suffered financially from the Wall Street Crash and defaulted on its mortgages in the years afterward. The Benenson Building and the company's other structures, including the adjacent 99 Liberty Street, were placed for sale in October 1931 as part of foreclosure proceedings against the company. The building at the time was assessed as being worth $10.4 million. Charles F. Noyes acquired the Benenson Building and several of Benenson's other properties the next month.

By 1936, there were plans to renovate the Benenson Building, with the project being funded through rental income. The Benenson Building and another adjacent structure were auctioned again in 1938 to satisfy the liens against the properties. The New York Trust Company acquired the Benenson Building for $5 million, and the building was renamed 165 Broadway. The building was renovated in 1941 for $300,000. The entrances, elevators, and corridors were renovated, and new fluorescent lighting was installed. At the time, the Chemical Bank occupied the first six floors of both 165 Broadway and the Gilsey Building. 165 Broadway, the Gilsey Building, and 99 Liberty Street were sold in 1947 to N. K. Winston and George Gregory for $11 million.

Demolition 
In 1964, United States Steel acquired the City Investing Building, along with the neighboring Singer Building. U.S. Steel planned to demolish the entire block to erect a new 54-story headquarters on the same site. Although preservationists attempted to get the New York City Landmarks Preservation Commission to protect the Singer Building, the City Investing Building received relatively little notice. Demolition of both buildings was underway by 1968.

The U.S. Steel Building (later known as One Liberty Plaza) was built on the site, being completed in 1973. One Liberty Plaza had at least twice the two former buildings' combined interior area. At the time of its destruction, the City Investing Building was the third-tallest building ever demolished, behind the Morrison Hotel and the Singer Building.

Impact 
The City Investing Building, along with other nearby sites such as the Singer Building, Hudson Terminal, and the Equitable Building, was a frequently photographed skyscraper in Lower Manhattan. The completion of the Equitable Building to the southeast in 1915 placed the City Investing Building into permanent shadow up to the 24th floor. The situation led to New York City's 1916 Zoning Resolution, which required buildings to be set back above a certain height.

According to architectural journalist Christopher Gray and architectural historians Sarah Landau and Carl Condit, the City Investing Building was regarded as a "monument to greed" with its sheer size. Photographs of the building almost always showed its northern side on Cortlandt Street because its primary elevation to the east along Broadway was excessively narrow. Architect Donn Barber described the facade as "somewhat showy both in design and material" and regarded the lobby as "the finest piece of commercial designing and execution that we have yet seen downtown." Kimball, the building's architect, characterized the light-toned exterior as contrasting with the "darker and more somber" appearance of nearby buildings.

References

Notes

Citations

Sources

External links 

 Online source with photographs
 Flickr photograph

1908 establishments in New York City
1968 disestablishments in New York (state)
Beaux-Arts architecture in New York City
Broadway (Manhattan)
Buildings and structures demolished in 1968
Demolished buildings and structures in Manhattan
Financial District, Manhattan
Former skyscrapers
Romanesque Revival architecture in New York City
Office buildings completed in 1908
Skyscraper office buildings in Manhattan